Jerry Loyd (born August 2, 1954) is a former American college basketball coach. He is a former head men's basketball coach at Louisiana Tech University. After leaving Louisiana Tech in 1994, Loyd was the head men's basketball coach at Dillard University from 1994–1998 and the school's Athletic Director from 1997–1998.

Head coaching record

References

External links
Historical Directories of the Gulf Coast Athletic Conference

1954 births
Living people
American men's basketball coaches
American men's basketball players
College men's basketball head coaches in the United States
LeTourneau University alumni
Louisiana Tech Bulldogs basketball coaches
Place of birth missing (living people)